A Piece of Strange is the third studio album by the Southern hip hop trio CunninLynguists, consisting of Kno, Deacon the Villain and Natti. It was released January 24, 2006, by The LA Underground, a record label based in New Mexico.

Background 
The “high-concept record” tells the "tale of the pathway to and from sin". The album was produced entirely by Kno, and vocals are by Kno, Deacon the Villain and Natti, who joined the group prior to the recording of the album. Featured guest vocalists include Cee-Lo Green, Immortal Technique, and Tonedeff. Deacon and Kno have both cited the album's importance to their careers in interviews, with Kno calling it a "turning point" for the group. CunninLynguists toured domestically and overseas in support of the album, appearing with acts such as Depeche Mode, Kanye West, Bun B, and Pharrell Williams.

Artwork 
The album's cover art is by Becky Cloonan. Cloonan's collaboration with CunninLynguists occurred following her listing their song "Love Ain't" as something she was listening to in an issue of her comic Demo.

Reception and legacy 

A Piece of Strange received widespread acclaim from critics, with XXL calling it "soulful", "raw", and "sophisticated", URB calling it "a piece of beauty", Scratch calling it "top-shelf", CMJ calling it a "beautiful...dense opera", and The A.V. Club calling it "vast and ambitious". Since its release in 2006, the album has been mentioned as one of the most important underground hip hop albums and praised for portraying a narrative not visited in any previous hip hop album.

Track listing

Notes
 "Since When" features additional vocals by Anetra and SunnyStylez
 "Brain Cell" features additional vocals by Anetra
 "The Light" features additional vocals by Ladonna Young and Anetra

Personnel
Credits for A Piece of Strange adapted from AllMusic.

 Willie Eames – lead guitar, bass guitar (tracks 1–3, 5–15)
 Tony Rojas – graphic design
 Chris Webster – engineering
 Becky Cloonan – cover illustrations
 Jesse Howerton – additional keyboards
 Greg Forsburg – mastering
 Kno – production, executive production, mixing, photography
 DJ Sicari – scratches (tracks 1–3, 5–16)
 G. Bush – writing (tracks 2–4, 6, 8–9, 13–16)
 R. Wisler – writing (tracks 1–16)
 W. Eames – writing (tracks 2–4, 10, 15–16)
 W. Polk – writing (tracks 1–6, 8–13, 15–16)

References

CunninLynguists albums
2006 albums
Concept albums